Piano Interpretations is the début album by jazz pianist Wynton Kelly released on the Blue Note label featuring performances by Kelly with Oscar Pettiford/Franklin Skeete, and Lee Abrams recorded in 1951. The CD reissue features 11 additional tracks.

Reception
The Allmusic review by Scott Yanow states: "Kelly in 1951 was already long on his way to achieving his own sound. Influenced most by Bud Powell but also displaying some of the joy of Teddy Wilson's style along with his own chord voicings, Kelly gives listeners no hints on this enjoyable CD (which has two complete sessions plus three alternate takes) that he was still a teenager".

Track listing
 "Blue Moon" (Lorenz Hart, Richard Rodgers) - 3:09
 "Fine and Dandy" (Paul James, Kay Swift) - 2:50
 "I Found a New Baby" (Jack Palmer, Spencer Williams) - 2:53
 "Cherokee" (Ray Noble) - 3:08
 "Born to Be Blue" (Mel Torme, Robert Wells) - 3:26
 "Where or When" (Hart, Rodgers) - 2:52
 "Moonglow" (Eddie DeLange, Will Hudson, Irving Mills) - 3:29
 "Moonglow" [alternate take] (DeLange, Hudson, Mills) - 3:11
 "If I Should Lose You" (Ralph Rainger, Leo Robin) - 3:04
 "Born to Be Blue" [alternate take] (Torme, Wells) - 3:00
 "Goodbye" [1st Take] (Gordon Jenkins) - 2:23
 "Goodbye" [2nd Take] (Jenkins) - 2:47
 "Foolin' Myself" (Jack Lawrence, Peter Tinturin) - 3:03
 "There Will Never Be Another You" (Mack Gordon, Harry Warren) - 3:03
 "Do Nothin' Till You Hear from Me" (Duke Ellington, Bob Russell) - 3:04
 "Summertime" (George Gershwin, Ira Gershwin, Dubose Heyward) - 3:11
 "Moonlight in Vermont" (John Blackburn, Karl Suessdorf) - 3:26
 "Crazy He Calls Me" (Bob Russell, Carl Sigman) - 3:18
 "Opus Caprice" (Al Haig) - 2:53
Recorded at WOR Studios in New York City on July 25, 1951 (tracks 1-10) and August 1, 1951 (tracks 11-19).

Personnel

Musicians
Wynton Kelly – piano (all tracks), celeste (track 17)
Oscar Pettiford (tracks 1 & 5-10), Franklin Skeete (tracks 2–4 & 11–19) – bass
Lee Abrams – drums, congas

Production
Gil Mellé – design
Francis Wolff – photography

References

External links 
 Wynton Kelly - Cherokee (New Faces, New Sounds)

1951 debut albums
Blue Note Records albums
Wynton Kelly albums
albums produced by Alfred Lion